Augustine United Church is a United Reformed Church in Edinburgh, Scotland. It is in a local ecumenical partnership with St Columba's-by-the-Castle (Scottish Episcopal Church) and Greyfriars Tolbooth and Highland Kirk (Church of Scotland).

History

The congregation began in 1802 in the Old Town area of Edinburgh and had a chapel in Chambers Street. The congregation outgrew the chapel, and in 1855 it was demolished to make way for the Industrial Museum of Scotland. The present building at 41 George IV Bridge was started in 1857 and completed in 1861. Its architecture is a freestyle mixture of Romanesque, Renaissance and Classical features topped by a three-tiered tower. It was made a Category B listed building in 1970. The building has recently been renovated and upgraded and is now called the Augustine Church Centre.

The centre today
The centre is home to a number of church-related charities and projects, including Christian Aid, Jubilee Scotland and the Edinburgh Community Mental Health Chaplaincy, as well as being the worship centre of Augustine United Church and the Metropolitan Community Church of Edinburgh.

Community, music, political and religious groups hold meetings and events in the centre throughout the week, including the Edinburgh Royal Choral Union and Edinburgh Youth Choir. Each summer, Paradise Green Promotions uses the centre as a venue for the Edinburgh Festival Fringe.

On Wednesday 12 February 1997 the National Launch of the first Fairtrade fortnight was held in the church.

References

External links

Category B listed buildings in Edinburgh
Churches in Edinburgh
Listed churches in Edinburgh
Old Town, Edinburgh
United Reformed churches in Scotland
19th-century churches in the United Kingdom